The Dayton’s Project is a mixed department store and office  located in downtown Minneapolis, Minnesota. It succeeded Dayton's at its downtown flagship store. The company was founded in 2017. It is known for continuing the 100 year tradition of window Christmas displays in downtown.

References

Department stores of the United States
Retail companies established in 2017
Companies based in Minneapolis